The Labour Court is a special lower court in Iceland established in 1938 to handle industrial disputes between trade unions and employer associations.

See also
National Court

References

External links
Official website 

1938 establishments in Iceland
Courts in Iceland
Organizations established in 1938